Roseau is a community on the island of Saint Lucia; it is located on the western side of the island, south of Marigot.

References

Towns in Saint Lucia